Saeid Sadeghi (born April 25, 1994) is an Iranian professional footballer who plays as a winger for Persian Gulf Pro League club Persepolis.

Club career

Persepolis
On 25 June 2022, Sadeghi joined Persian Gulf Pro League side Persepolis on a one-year deal.

Club career statistics

References

External links 
 

Iranian footballers
1994 births
Living people
Association football wingers
Shahr Khodro F.C. players
Paykan F.C. players
Sanat Mes Kerman F.C. players
Niroye Zamini players
Saba players
Persepolis F.C. players
Gol Gohar players
Khooneh be Khooneh players
Sanat Sari players
Sportspeople from Sari, Iran
Persian Gulf Pro League players